Mirrabooka is a suburb of Perth, Western Australia. Its local government area is the City of Stirling. Mirrabooka is an Aboriginal name for the constellation most commonly known as the Southern Cross.

In the early stages of development of the suburb, it was originally considered as an extension of Girrawheen, and Nollamara. In the 1980s and 1990s the suburb expanded rapidly with the subdivision of bushland, on which housing developments have been built, especially north of Yirrigan Drive.

The Mirrabooka Square shopping centre, which originally opened in 1979, has since received a number of expansions. A police station near the shopping centre was opened in 1998, and was expanded in 2015.

Transport
The suburb is home to the Mirrabooka bus station, a hub for bus transport in the area, and is served by a number of Transperth bus routes operated by Path Transit and Swan Transit, including connections to Perth, Warwick railway station and Stirling.

For the part north of Reid Highway, the western end on Mirrabooka Avenue is covered by routes 374 and 376. Route 377 runs in Honeywell Boulevard, and route 378 runs in Australis Avenue; the eastern end on Alexander Drive is covered by routes 360, 361 and 362; the northern end on Beach Road is covered by route 449. All of these services are operated by Path Transit except route 374, which is operated by Swan Transit.

Schools
Boyare Primary School (1991)
Dryandra Primary School (1989)
John Septimus Roe Anglican Community School (1990)

References

Suburbs of Perth, Western Australia
Suburbs in the City of Stirling